Edenburg is a town situated about  south of Bloemfontein in the Free State province of South Africa. , it had a population of 14,566.

Background 
Edenburg was proclaimed a town in 1863 and received municipal government in 1891.

The town is 85 km south-south-west of Bloemfontein. Laid out on the farm Rietfontein in 1862 with the Dutch Reformed Church built in the same year and it became a municipality in 1891. The name is said to be either of biblical origin or an adaptation of Edinburgh, name of the birthplace in Scotland of the Reverend Andrew Murray, for many years the only minister in the Orange Free State.

The N1 highway bypasses the town to the east, while the Port Elizabeth–Bloemfontein railway runs along its western edge.

References

Populated places in the Kopanong Local Municipality
Populated places founded by Afrikaners
Populated places established in 1862
1862 establishments in the Orange Free State